= Masoud Farkhondeh Tinat Fard =

Iranian producer and director

- Masoud Farkhondeh Tinat Fard, Iranian Director
- Born: December 23, 1968 (age 57); Tehran, Iran
- Occupations: Director, Producer
- Website: Aftab Honar Afarin

Masoud Farkhondeh Tinat Fard (born December 23, 1968, in Tehran) is an Iranian producer and director. He has been the winner of the Best Director's statue in Children Film Festival of Isfahan.

== Films ==
| Film name | Director | Producer |
|---|---|---|
| Qadam Kheir | Masoud Farkhondeh Tinat Fard | Masoud Farkhondeh Tinat Fard |
| Real Lightening | Majid Sarvini | Masoud Farkhondeh Tinat Fard |
| Green Morning | Masoud Farkhondeh Tinat Fard | Abbas Ranjbar |
| Calm and Count to Seven | Ramtin Lavafi | Masoud Farkhondeh Tinat Fard - Ramtin Lavafi |
| White like Star | Javad Roustaie | Masoud Farkhondeh Tinat Fard |
| Never Let me go | Masoud Farkhondeh Tinat Fard | Qasem Qadiani |
| Revar | Masoud Farkhondeh Tinat Fard | |
| Incomplete Woman | Fereydoun Farhoudi | Masoud Farkhondeh Tinat Fard |

== Series ==
| Series Name | Director | Producer |
|---|---|---|
| Signal exists | Mehdi Mazloumi | Masoud Farkhondeh |
| Siam and Tiam | Masoud Farkhondeh Tinat Fard | |
| Searching Lost Part | Masoud Farkhondeh Tinat Fard | Masoud Farkhondeh Tinat Fard |
